Mohamed Zulficar (born 4 September 1918) was an Egyptian Olympic sabre fencer. He competed at the 1948 and 1952 Summer Olympics.

References

External links
 

1918 births
Possibly living people
Egyptian male sabre fencers
Olympic fencers of Egypt
Fencers at the 1948 Summer Olympics
Fencers at the 1952 Summer Olympics